The 1942–43 William & Mary Indians men's basketball team represented the College of William & Mary in intercollegiate basketball during the 1943–44 NCAA men's basketball season. Under the first year of head coach Rube McCray, the team finished the season 10–11 and 1–3 in the Southern Conference. Due to World War II, the Indians played a reduced conference schedule. This was the 39th season of the collegiate basketball program at William & Mary, whose nickname is now the Tribe.

The Indians finished in 10th place in the conference and qualified for the 1944 Southern Conference men's basketball tournament, hosted by North Carolina State University at the Thompson Gym in Raleigh, North Carolina, where they lost in the first round to Duke.

Schedule

|-
!colspan=9 style="background:#006400; color:#FFD700;"| Regular season

|-
!colspan=9 style="background:#006400; color:#FFD700;"| 1943 Southern Conference Tournament

Source

References

William & Mary Tribe men's basketball seasons
William and Mary Indians
William and Mary Indians Men's Basketball Team
William and Mary Indians Men's Basketball Team